Dreamtale is a Finnish power/symphonic metal band from Tampere, formed in 1999.

History 
The music project was founded by guitarist Rami Keränen in early 1999. Keränen also served as the band's vocalist until 2002. The band first gathered fame by playing as Sinergy's supporting act in Finland, and their second demo, Refuge from Reality, sold out on the day of its release.

Most of the copies of the demo were sold in Japan, which helped the band make itself known to record labels. Dreamtale started receiving recording deal offers from around the world, and in August 2001 signed a deal with Spinefarm Records.

In December 2001, Dreamtale started the recordings of Beyond Reality. After finishing the album, Dreamtale went through changes in their line-up: Pasi Ristolainen replaced bassist Alois Weimer, and a new singer, Tomi Viiltola, joined the group. Keränen is the sole founding member to remain with the band.

Beyond Reality, which was released in Japan in June and elsewhere during July 2002, selling well and gaining the band a following in Japan. To please Japanese fans, the band quickly began recording a second full-length album.

Recordings for their second album Ocean's Heart were begun in January 2003 at Fantom studios Finland, where the album was then mixed by Samu Oittinen. Finishing touches were added with Mika Jussila's mastering at Finnvox-studios.

Keyboardist Turkka Vuorinen left the band in 2006 and was replaced by Akseli Kaasalainen. In late 2008, bassist Pasi Ristolainen left the band, mainly because of a lack of motivation. Dreamtale has since replaced him with Heikki Ahonen.

In 2010, they released samples of songs called Angel Of Light, Reasons Revealed and Strangers' Ode. The 5th album called Epsilon was released in 2011 through the band's own label Secret Door Records. This album saw the return of original drummer, Petteri Rosenbom. With Epsilon released also in Russia by Fono Ltd., the band played their first shows abroad in St. Petersburg and Moscow in October 2011.

It was announced on 14 January 2013 that their sixth studio album was being recorded. Timo Tolkki mixed the album in February and the track list was revealed that same month. The album, World Changed Forever, was released on 26 April 2013.

On 9 December 2016, Dreamtale released their seventh studio album, entitled Seventhian... Memories of Time. Alongside the 12 new songs that comprise the first disc, re-recordings of several tracks from the band's earlier albums were also released.

Members

Current members 
 Nitte Valo – vocals (2019–present)
 Jarno Vitri - vocals (2019-present)
 Rami Keränen – guitars (1999–present), vocals (1999–2002), keyboards (1999–2000)
 Mikko Hepo-Oja – bass (2019–present)
 Akseli Kaasalainen – keyboards (2006–present)
 Janne Juutinen – drums (2014–present)
 Zsolt Szilagyi – guitars (2019–present)

Former members 
 Kalle-Pekka Ware – guitar (1999)
 Petri Laitinen – bass (1999–2000)
 Kimmo Arramies – session bass (2000)
 Mikko Viheriälä – session keyboards (2000)
 Turkka Vuorinen – keyboards (2000–2006)
 Alois Weimer – bass (2000–2002)
 Tomi Viiltola – vocals (2002–2003)
 Esa Orjatsalo – guitar (1999–2004)
 Jarkko Ahola – vocals (2003–2005)
 Arto Pitkänen – drums (2007–2010)
 Rolf Pilve – drums (2005–2007)
 Nils Nordling – vocals (2005–2007)
 Pasi Ristolainen – bass (2002–2008)
 Mikko Mattila – guitar (2004–2007)
 Petteri Rosenbom – drums (1999–2005, 2010–2014)
 Erkki Seppänen – vocals (2007–2019)
 Seppo Kolehmainen – guitar (2007–2019)
 Heikki Ahonen – bass (2009–2019)

Timeline

Discography

Studio albums

Singles

Demos 
 Shadow of the Frozen Sun (1999)
 Refuge from Reality (2000)

References

External links 
 
 

Musical groups established in 1999
Finnish power metal musical groups
1999 establishments in Finland